Greece competed at the 1928 Summer Olympics in Amsterdam, Netherlands. Greek athletes have competed in every Summer Olympic Games. 23 competitors, all men, took part in 26 events in 4 sports.

Athletics

Boxing

Men's Flyweight (– 50.8 kg)
 Nikolaos Felix
 First Round — Defeated José Turra Riviera (CHL), points
 Second Round — Lost to Alfredo Gaona (MEX), points

Fencing

Five fencers, all men, represented Greece in 1928.

Men's foil
 Konstantinos Botasis
 Konstantinos Nikolopoulos

Men's épée
 Tryfon Triantafyllakos
 Konstantinos Bembis
 Georgios Ambet

Men's team épée
 Konstantinos Botasis, Tryfon Triantafyllakos, Konstantinos Nikolopoulos, Georgios Ambet, Konstantinos Bembis

Men's team sabre
 Konstantinos Botasis, Georgios Ambet, Tryfon Triantafyllakos, Konstantinos Nikolopoulos

Wrestling

References

External links
Official Olympic Reports

Nations at the 1928 Summer Olympics
1928
Summer Olympics